What's Your News? is a children's animated television program. It is billed as the first-ever news show for and about children, helping them deal with their transition into the world around them. The series use to be shown in all English countries. But as of 2019, it's only airing in the U.S. It aired on in Canada CBC (stopped airing in 2019), in the UK on Nick Jr. (stopped airing in 2014), in the U.S. on PBS Kids Sprout (stopped airing in 2014) and in Australia on ABC Television.

Overview
What's Your News? is a children's television series that concentrates on children's news. Hosted by animated news anchors, Grant the Ant and Antony the Aardvark, it follows the classic news programme format and features interviews with children, special reports, traffic updates, and weather reports.

Production
The series was created by Original Pictures and TT Animation; a small production company which is a subsidiary of TT Games, in turn part of Hollywood major film studio Warner Bros., a division of American conglomerate Time Warner. It was produced using a technologically innovative combination of Live action, Motion capture, and Performed Animation, in conjunction with director Robert Tygner and originating puppeteer William Todd-Jones. A total of 52 episodes were produced over an 18-month period.

It features both CGI content and CGI characters composited into filmed live action sequences. The series' production framework sidesteps many of the labor and time intensive activities normally associated with animated content creation. Character animations are obtained via acted motion capture methods, with instrumented puppetry rigs being used for facial and other auxiliary animations.

References

2000s British animated television series
2000s British children's television series
2010 British television series debuts
2012 British television series endings
2000s Canadian animated television series
2000s Canadian children's television series
2010 Canadian television series debuts
2012 Canadian television series endings
British children's animated television shows
British computer-animated television series
British preschool education television series
British television series with live action and animation
British television shows featuring puppetry
Canadian children's animated television series
Canadian computer-animated television series
Canadian preschool education television series
Canadian television series with live action and animation
Canadian television shows featuring puppetry
Nick Jr. original programming
CBC Kids original programming
Universal Kids original programming
Australian Broadcasting Corporation original programming
China Television original programming
Fuji TV original programming
English-language television shows
Animated preschool education television series
2000s preschool education television series
2010s preschool education television series